François de Saint-Just (19 March 1896 - 19 October 1989) was a French politician. He served as a member of the Chamber of Deputies from 1933 to 1942, representing Pas-de-Calais. He was a knight of the Legion of Honour.

References

1896 births
1989 deaths
People from Joigny
Politicians from Bourgogne-Franche-Comté
Republican Federation politicians
Members of the 15th Chamber of Deputies of the French Third Republic
Members of the 16th Chamber of Deputies of the French Third Republic
Chevaliers of the Légion d'honneur